Taiwo Micheal Awoniyi (born 12 August 1997) is a Nigerian professional footballer who plays as a forward for  club Nottingham Forest and the Nigeria national team.

Club career

Early career
In 2010, Awoniyi was voted the Most Valuable Player at a Coca-Cola football competition in London. His performance at the competition was spotted by Seyi Olofinjana who invited him to join the Imperial Soccer Academy.

Liverpool
On 31 August 2015, Awoniyi signed for English club Liverpool for a fee of around £400,000 but was immediately loaned out to German team FSV Frankfurt.

Loans to FSV Frankfurt and NEC
Awoniyi made his debut for Frankfurt as a late substitute in a German Cup match against Hertha Berlin.  After being named as a substitute for six league matches, he made his debut on 19 February 2016, playing 89 minutes against FC St. Pauli. Awoniyi suffered relegation with Frankfurt, and he returned to Liverpool at the end of the season.

On 26 August 2016, Dutch team NEC confirmed that Awoniyi had joined them on a season-long loan and was expected to join the squad the following week after the formalities of his work permit were completed. On 10 September, he made his Eredivisie debut in a 40 defeat of NEC to PSV Eindhoven, being replaced in the 72nd minute by Michael Heinloth.With NEC, the Nigerian suffered his second consecutive relegation, being relegated from Eredivisie in 2017.

Loans to Mouscron and Gent
In July 2017, Awoniyi left NEC and joined Belgian club Royal Excel Mouscron on a season-long loan, and made his debut on 12 August when he started the match against KSC Lokeren, scoring within 22 minutes.

On 17 July 2018, Awoniyi signed a new long-term deal with Liverpool, and on 23 July sealed a season-long loan to another Belgian club, Gent. On 11 January 2019, it was announced that his loan to Gent was cut short, and Awoniyi was loaned to Mouscron again. In April he said that his struggle to get a UK work permit could end his Liverpool career.

Loans to Mainz 05 and Union Berlin 
On 6 August 2019, Liverpool confirmed Awoniyi had joined Bundesliga side Mainz 05 on a season-long loan. He was hospitalized in June 2020, after sustaining a severe concussion during a 1–0 loss to FC Augsburg in the league.

On 19 September 2020, Awoniyi left for his seventh loan spell, this time joining Bundesliga side Union Berlin for a year.

Union Berlin
On 20 July 2021, Awoniyi rejoined Union Berlin, this time on a permanent basis. The German club reportedly paid £6.5 million for the forward. Liverpool negotiated a 10% sell-on clause in this deal.

Nottingham Forest
On 25 June 2022, Awoniyi completed a move to newly promoted Premier League side Nottingham Forest on a five-year deal. The transfer fee paid was a club record for Forest, reportedly £17 million. On 14 August 2022, he scored his first Premier League goal in a 1–0 win against West Ham United. On 22 October 2022, he scored the winning goal against Liverpool in the Premier League match at home.

International career
Awoniyi represented Nigeria at the 2013 FIFA U-17 World Cup and went on to win the tournament, scoring four goals during the competition. He also represented Nigeria at the 2015 FIFA U-20 World Cup in New Zealand after winning the 2015 African U-20 Championship in Senegal.

On 12 April 2015, he scored a brace on his debut for the Nigeria U-23 team in a match against Zambia, as his team went on to qualify for the 2015 All African Games.

He was selected by Nigeria for their 35-man provisional squad for the 2016 Summer Olympics.

He was selected by Gernot Rohr in late 2021 to represent Nigeria at the 2022 FIFA World Cup qualifiers, making his debut in their 1–0 loss to the Central African Republic. Awoniyi was selected to represent Nigeria at the AFCON 2021 where he led the line for Nigeria throughout the tournament. His only goal during the tournament came in the 3-1 group stage win against Sudan.

Style of play
Parallels have been drawn between Awoniyi's style of play, and that of Rashidi Yekini, Nigeria's all-time highest goalscorer.

Personal life
Awoniyi has a younger twin sister called Kehinde. He married his partner Taiwo Jesudun in an engagement and traditional wedding in Kabba on 15 June 2018, followed by a white wedding on 16 June in Ilorin.

Career statistics

Honours
Nigeria U17
FIFA U-17 World Cup: 2013

Nigeria U20
African U-20 Championship: 2015

Individual
African U-20 Championship Team of the Tournament: 2015

References

External links

Profile at the Nottingham Forest F.C. website

1997 births
Living people
People from Ilorin
Sportspeople from Kwara State
Nigerian footballers
Association football forwards
Liverpool F.C. players
FSV Frankfurt players
NEC Nijmegen players
Royal Excel Mouscron players
K.A.A. Gent players
1. FC Union Berlin players
Nottingham Forest F.C. players
Bundesliga players
2. Bundesliga players
Eredivisie players
Belgian Pro League players
Premier League players
Nigeria youth international footballers
Nigeria under-20 international footballers
Nigeria international footballers
2021 Africa Cup of Nations players
Nigerian expatriate footballers
Nigerian expatriate sportspeople in Germany
Expatriate footballers in Germany
Nigerian expatriate sportspeople in the Netherlands
Expatriate footballers in the Netherlands
Nigerian expatriate sportspeople in Belgium
Expatriate footballers in Belgium
Nigerian expatriate sportspeople in England
Expatriate footballers in England
Yoruba sportspeople